Zurich is a community in southwestern Ontario, Canada, in the Municipality of Bluewater in Huron County, about six kilometres inland from Lake Huron, on Ontario's west coast. Zurich was founded in 1856 and is known for its Swiss heritage, as is reflected in some of the architecture. It has four churches of various denominations, a large community centre, a general store, a hardware store, a Case Tractor dealership, St. Boniface Elementary School, and a Liquor Control Board of Ontario retail store.

On the fourth weekend in August, Zurich has its annual Bean Festival. The annual Bean Festival in Zurich is the highlight of the year with many local and international vendors attending. It includes many traditional carnival rides. Also, there is a classic and vintage car show spanning the entire festival from Friday to Sunday. Traditionally, there is a "cruise night," encompassing all of Huron County on Friday night.

Demographics 

Notable people
 Babe Siebert (1904–1939), member of the Hockey Hall of Fame.

See also

 List of unincorporated communities in Ontario

References

External links

 Zurich, Ontario blog
 Zurich Bean Festival
 Grand Bend Strip community newspaper - serving Zurich, Grand Bend, Dashwood and Port Franks

Designated places in Ontario
Communities in Huron County, Ontario
Former villages in Ontario
Swiss Canadian